This is a list of video games published and/or developed by Telltale Games. Telltale Games closed as a studio in 2018 and its assets were sold off. LCG Entertainment purchased the majority of Telltale's licenses and assets and began doing business as a video game publisher under the Telltale Games brand name in 2019.

Games developed (Telltale Games 2004–2018)

Games published

Under Telltale Games (2004–2018)

Under Telltale Games (2018–present)

Notes

References

External links
 

Telltale Games
Telltale Games games